Premonition is a 2007 American supernatural thriller film directed by Mennan Yapo and starring Sandra Bullock in the lead role, Julian McMahon, Nia Long and Amber Valletta. The film's plot depicts a homemaker named Linda who experiences the days surrounding her husband's death in a non-chronological order, and how she attempts to save him from his impending doom.

Plot 
Jim and Linda Hanson are married with two daughters, Megan and Bridgette, but their relationship is faltering. Jim is away on a business trip and Linda has just listened to a phone message from him when Sheriff Reilly knocks on the door and informs her that Jim died in a car accident the previous day. Linda's mother Joanne arrives to help the family, and Linda falls asleep on the living-room couch.

The next morning she wakes up in bed and goes downstairs to find Jim drinking coffee and watching TV. While on the road, Linda is pulled over by Sheriff Reilly, who doesn't recognize her.

The next day, Jim is once again dead and Linda, her mother and the girls arrive at the church for his funeral, at the same time the casket arrives. Linda, wanting answers, insists the funeral director opens the casket to see if Jim is in there. The funeral director tries to explain that Linda would be best not to see Jim, given how he died and the extent of his wounds. In the scuffle, the casket is dropped and Jim’s head is briefly seen to fall out.

The next day, Linda awakens next to an empty bottle of lithium pills prescribed by Dr. Norman Roth. She goes downstairs and to Jim’s wake and goes outside to see the girls playing on the swings. When Jim is again dead and Bridgette turns to face her, she has scars on her face.

At Jim's burial, Linda notices a strange woman mourning at a distance, who flees when Linda approaches her. Linda finds Dr. Roth's phone number in the garbage, but his voice-mail message states that the office is only open on weekdays. Roth later subdues her with two assistants and Sheriff Reilly and commits her to a mental-health facility. Roth confides in Reilly that Linda told him Jim was dead the day before the accident, suggesting the likelihood she murdered him and scarred Bridgette's face.

The next day Linda awakens in bed and finds Jim in the shower. She holds him to feel that he is real.

After dropping the girls off at school, she goes home and searches for the lithium bottle, but doesn't find it.  She gets the address for Dr. Roth from the phone book and visits his office.  He doesn't recognize her, and she tells him about the premonitions she's been having. He suggests she is daydreaming and maybe she wants her husband dead.  He prescribes lithium and she leaves. Linda visits Jim at his office and meets the stranger from the funeral, who introduces herself as Claire Francis. Linda sees the way Jim interacts with Claire and realizes Jim seems to like her too much. Back at the house, Linda lets the lithium tablets go into the sink.

A storm starts so Linda and the girls run to bring in the laundry but Bridgette does not realise that the glass door is closed and, despite Linda's warning, Bridgette runs through it and cuts her face and hands in the process. She takes her to the emergency room. Jim arrives and learns what happened.  Bridgette returns home stitched up, and Jim complains that Linda didn't put stickers on the glass door for safety. Although Linda says she did. Linda throws Dr. Roth's number into the garbage. Suddenly, she realizes her days are unfolding out of order. She creates a calendar of events from what she remembers, and records Tuesday as the current day. Before Jim goes to bed she begs him not to go on the business trip.  She tells him, "If tomorrow is Wednesday, please, wake me up before you leave. Promise me."  He does.

Linda wakes up and sees that it's now Friday morning and her mom is there. She updates the calendar she had made.  She goes to see Claire who is visibly upset and tells Linda Jim was going to cheat on her.  Linda confides in her friend about what happened with Jim and Claire, and suggests he didn't do it, but it would be very damaging if he had. She visits their safe deposit box at the bank and finds the insurance policy.  The agent lets her know the finances should be in order, and he informs Linda that Jim came in two days earlier and tripled his insurance benefits.  She visits their priest, then visits the funeral home, telling the person she already knows who she is.  Linda returns home to her mother and daughters.  She tells her she made funeral arrangements already for Saturday. Linda asks her mom if she "lets" Jim die, is it the same as killing him? Her mother replies "Jim is already dead".

Next day, Linda awakens and suggests Jim spend some time with the girls. Linda goes to the church and visits with their priest. He says its been a long time since he saw her. She tells him she is scared. The priest talks about other cases where people in history have had such premonitions.  He explains she needs to have faith and fight for it.  Linda drives out to mile marker 220 where Jim's accident was to see what may have happened. Jim and the girls return home to Linda. After dinner the girls go to say goodnight to their dad and Linda insists he tells them he loves them.  Linda pleads with Jim outside in the rain about their relationship and tells him they're running out of time. Lightning strikes a power line, and kills the crow which she found dead a different day. Later that night, she tells him she had a dream which he was going to die. He says it was only a dream. They spend the night together.

Linda wakes up in her bed on Wednesday and reads a note from Jim saying he has taken the kids to school and he will be back tomorrow. She searches for Jim, and calls him but gets voicemail.  She goes out to look for him.  Jim is seen at the bank with the insurance agent. Linda shows up to the school and sees her kids are there already. Jim calls Claire who is at the hotel where they planned to meet and he tells her he can't go forward seeing her.  Next he calls the house and leaves the message from the beginning of the film. As Jim nears the site of the accident, Linda reaches him by cell phone and the two have a reconciliation after she tells him she knows about Claire. Linda tells Jim to turn the car around to avert the accident. This instead causes the accident with a fuel tanker truck, as Jim's car stalls in the middle of the road when performing the turn. The tanker jackknifes and crushes the car's roof while dragging it to within an inch of the mile marker. Both vehicles explode on impact and Jim burns to death.

The film's final scene is set a few months later. Linda recalls the priest's words about faith. Linda is pregnant.

Cast 
 Sandra Bullock as Linda Hanson
 Julian McMahon as James "Jim" Hanson
 Courtney Taylor Burness as Bridgette Hanson
 Shyann McClure as Megan Hanson
 Amber Valletta as Claire Francis
 Nia Long as Annie
 Kate Nelligan as Joanne
 Marc Macaulay as Sheriff Reilly
 Jude Ciccolella as Father Kennedy
 Peter Stormare as Dr. Norman Roth
 Seamus Davey-Fitzpatrick as Simon Hanson
 Mark Famiglietti as Doug Caruthers
 Marcus Lyle Brown as Bob
 E.J. Stapleton as Model Home Salesman
 Matt Moore as young priest
 Irene Zeigler as Mrs. Quinn
 Laurel Whitsett as school aide
 Kristin Ketterer as receptionist
 Jason Douglas as emergency room doctor
 Lonnie Magargle as doctor's assistant
 Floriana Tullio as nurse

Production 
Principal photography mostly took place in Minden and Shreveport, Louisiana. This film is also the first to be co-distributed by TriStar Pictures and Metro-Goldwyn-Mayer.

Release 
The film was first released in the U.S. on March 16, 2007. It was not released theatrically in Norway, but it was released direct-to-video on January 2, 2008 there.

Home media 
The film was released on Blu-ray and DVD on July 17, 2007.

Reception

Box office 
Premonition opened in 2,831 theaters and came in third place behind 300 and Wild Hogs, opening with $17,558,689 with a $6,202 average. The film stayed in theaters for 7 weeks and grossed $47,852,604 in the United States and $84,146, 832 worldwide.

Critical reception 
Premonition received negative reviews from critics. Review aggregator Rotten Tomatoes reports that 8% of 163 critics gave the film a positive review, with a rating average of 3.86/10. The site's general consensus is that "Overdosing on flashbacks, and more portentous than profound, the overly obtuse Premonition weakly echoes such twisty classics as Memento, The Sixth Sense, and Groundhog Day." On Metacritic, which assigns a normalized rating out of 100 to reviews from film critics, the film is considered to have "generally unfavorable reviews" with a rating score of 29 based on 30 critics. Critic James Berardinelli gave the movie 2-1/2-stars (out of five) stating, "There's some interesting material in the film about pre-destination and questions about whether it's possible to change fate."   Expressing similar thoughts of blasé opaque contributions of the main characters wife Linda Hanson (Sandra Bullock) and husband James Hanson (Julian McMahon). Despite the bad reviews, several critics, including Rex Reed, commended Sandra Bullock for her performance.

References

External links 
 Official website
 
 
 
 
 
 DVD Review: Premonition - Monsters and Critics

2007 films
2000s English-language films
American nonlinear narrative films
Hyde Park Entertainment films
Metro-Goldwyn-Mayer films
American supernatural thriller films
TriStar Pictures films
American disaster films
Films about time travel
Films shot in Louisiana
Films scored by Klaus Badelt
2000s supernatural thriller films
Films directed by Mennan Yapo
Films about precognition
Films about road accidents and incidents
2000s American films